Monty Lyman (born October 1992) is a British medical doctor and author.

Education and career
Lyman studied at Imperial College London, University of Oxford and the University of Birmingham, followed by a medical internship at the John Radcliffe Hospital. He is currently a medical doctor and research fellow at the University of Oxford.

Books
His first book, The Remarkable Life of the Skin is described by his publisher (Transworld, Penguin Random House) as "the first popular science book to explore our most overlooked organ in all its physical, psychological and social glory". It was published in July 2019. The book was a Sunday Times ‘Must Read’, one of their ‘Best Books of 2019’, and chosen as a BBC Radio 4 Book of the Week.

Lyman's second book, The Painful Truth, was published in July 2021 and quickly became a Top 10 bestseller of all books sold on Amazon.

Awards and nominations
The Remarkable Life of the Skin was shortlisted for the 2019 Royal Society Science Book Prize. Aged 26 at the time, Lyman remains the youngest shortlisted author in the prize’s 34-year history.

While the Wellcome Book Prize paused in 2019, The Remarkable Life of the Skin won the public vote in the unofficial but Wellcome-endorsed #NotTheWellcomePrize.

Lyman’s essay based on The Painful Truth won the 2020 Royal Society of Medicine's Pain Medicine prize.

Media
Lyman has appeared on TV (BBC Breakfast, BBC Morning Live), radio (including BBC Inside Science and BBC World Service), and on podcasts (such as BBC science focus), and has been a keynote speaker at national and international conferences. Lyman has also written articles for newspapers (including The Guardian) and literary journals (for example, Literary Hub).

Personal life
He lives in Oxford, England.

Published works

References

English medical writers
1992 births
Living people
21st-century English medical doctors
Alumni of Imperial College London
21st-century English male writers
Alumni of the University of Birmingham
Alumni of the University of Oxford